Chris Tvedt (born 1954) is a Norwegian lawyer and crime fiction writer.

Tvedt was born in Bergen. He made his literary debut in 2005 with the crime novel Rimelig tvil . He was awarded the Riverton Prize for Dødens sirkel in 2010. Later books are Av jord er du kommet from 2012, Den blinde guden from 2013, Djevelens barn from 2014, and Den som forvolder en annens død from 2016.

References

1954 births
Living people
Writers from Bergen
Norwegian male novelists
Norwegian crime fiction writers
Lawyers from Bergen
21st-century Norwegian novelists
21st-century Norwegian male writers